Dewey Lake is a lake in St. Louis County, in the U.S. state of Minnesota.

According to Warren Upham, Dewey Lake may be named for George Dewey (1837–1917), an American admiral.

See also
List of lakes in Minnesota

References

Lakes of Minnesota
Lakes of St. Louis County, Minnesota